Jing Teng (born 20 May 1990 in Ma'anshan) is a Chinese-born Hong Kong footballer who plays for Hong Kong First Division club Wong Tai Sin as a midfielder.

Club career

Early career
Jing Teng was one of the member of Shanghai Shenhua youth team. In 2006, when he was playing for Shanghai Shenhua youth team against Red Star Belgrade youth team, he was scouted by the opposite side scout and nearly joined the club, but failed to obtain a visa, which made the deal fell through.

Tai Po
Che joined Hong Kong First Division club Tai Po in 2009. He started developed as a regular first team member in the 2012–13 season as he featured a total of 27 matches in the season, although Tai Po were relegated at the end of the season.

Sun Hei
Che joined fellow First Division club Sunray Cave JC Sun Hei on 1 June 2013.

International career
Born in China, Jing Teng joined Hong Kong club Tai Po in 2009. After playing for Tai Po two years, he successfully gain a citizenship in Hong Kong. He was selected into the Hong Kong U21 in 2011. On 15 June 2013, he was chosen as one of the member of the Hong Kong U23 training squad for the 2013 East Asian Games.

On 3 May 2013, he was called up by the Hong Kong national football team for the first time. The training squad was to prepare for the International friendly against the Philippines on 4 June 2013 in Hong Kong.

Career statistics

Club
 As of 5 May 2013.

1 Others include Hong Kong Season Play-offs.

Honours

Club
Tai Po
Hong Kong Senior Shield (1): 2012-13

References

External links
 
 Jing Teng at HKFA

1990 births
Living people
Hong Kong footballers
Chinese footballers
Chinese expatriate footballers
Hong Kong First Division League players
Hong Kong Premier League players
Tai Po FC players
Sun Hei SC players
R&F (Hong Kong) players
Association football midfielders
People from Ma'anshan
Footballers from Anhui